The Windrose 5.5 is  an American trailerable sailboat that was designed by W. Shad Turner as a pocket cruiser and first built in 1977.

The Windrose 5.5 was developed from the Windrose 18 and was developed into the Laguna 18 in 1983.

Production
The design was built by Laguna Yachts in Stanton, California, United States, but it is now out of production.

Design
The Windrose 5.5 is a recreational keelboat, built predominantly of fiberglass, with wood trim. It has a fractional sloop rig with a deck-stepped mast and aluminum spars. The hull has a raked stem, a plumb transom, a transom-hung rudder controlled by a tiller and a fixed fin shoal-draft keel. It displaces  and carries  of ballast.

The boat is normally fitted with a small  outboard motor for docking and maneuvering.

The design has sleeping accommodation for four people, with a double "V"-berth in the bow cabin and two quarter berths under the cockpit. The head is located just aft of the companionway steps and is a portable type. Ventilation is provided by a hatch on the foredeck.

Operational history
In a 1994 review Richard Sherwood wrote that the, "Windrose is designed as a little cruiser and has bunks for four, with a double berth forward and two quarter berths. Space remains for cabin seating, shelf storage, and a head. This shoal-draft boat has 500 pounds of ballast in the keel. The manufacturer claims that the special shape of the keel makes Windrose track unusually well."

In a 2010 review Steve Henkel wrote, "by 1980 the design trend was toward wider boats, for extra stability as well as cabin space. Laguna Yachts and Shad Turner responded by widening the six-year-old Windrose 18 ... from seven feet to eight feet, and introducing a number of other changes. Principal among these were (a) eliminating the potentially troublesome steel centerboard and substituting instead a shallow iron-filled keel, and (b) rearranging the cabin space for more elbow room. For example, the portable head was moved aft where its use wouldn't interfere with V-berth sleepers; the settee berths in the '18' were replaced by wider quarter berths and a central seating area. Best features: The new design eliminates worry over centerboard difficulties, and provides more elbow room. Worst features: The fixed keel is too shallow to give good sailing performance compared to the Windrose 18's (despite the fact that PHRF rating for both the 18 and the 5.5 is—unfairly—identical at 288), and the keel makes launching and retrieving at a launching ramp considerably more difficult than with her comps or with the shallower-draft '18'."

See also
List of sailing boat types

References

External links

Keelboats
1970s sailboat type designs
Sailing yachts
Trailer sailers
Sailboat type designs by W. Shad Turner
Sailboat types built by Laguna Yachts